Haakon County is a county in the U.S. state of South Dakota. As of the 2020 census, the population was 1,872. Its county seat is Philip.

History
The county was created in 1914 and organized in 1915, and was formed from the original counties of Nowlin and most of Sterling, which had previously been absorbed by Stanley County. It is named for Haakon VII, who became king of Norway in 1905. It is the only county in South Dakota named for a non-American person and is one of only nine counties in South Dakota named for persons who did not live in South Dakota. Most of South Dakota's counties are named for early South Dakota officials or legislators, or for physical features (Fall River and Lake), or are derived from Native American words (Minnehaha and Yankton), or from counties in other states (Jones and Walworth), with one (Aurora) named for a Roman goddess, one for an animal (Buffalo), and one (Union) for a concept.

Geography
The terrain of Haakon County consists of semi-arid rolling hills, carved with gullies and drainages, partially devoted to agriculture. The Cheyenne River, a tributary of the Missouri River, flows northeastward along the county's north boundary line, and the Bad River flows east-northeastward through the lower part of the county, both heading for their discharge points into the Missouri. The terrain slopes to the northeast, and its highest point is near the midpoint of its western boundary line, at 2,802' (854m) ASL.

The eastern portion of South Dakota's counties (48 of 66) observe Central Time; the western counties (18 of 66) observe Mountain Time. Haakon County is the easternmost of the SD counties to observe Mountain Time.

Major highways

  U.S. Highway 14
  South Dakota Highway 34
  South Dakota Highway 63
  South Dakota Highway 73

Adjacent counties

 Ziebach County - north
 Stanley County - east
 Jones County - southeast (observes Central Time)
 Jackson County - south
 Pennington County - west

Protected areas
 Billsburg State Game Production Area
 Cheyenne State Game Production Area (part)

Lakes
 Waggoner Lake

Demographics

2000 census
As of the 2000 United States Census, there were 2,196 people, 870 households, and 620 families in the county. The population density was 1.21 person per square mile (0.47/km2).  There were 1,002 housing units at an average density of 0.55 per square mile (0.21/km2). The racial makeup of the county was 96.40% White, 2.50% Native American, 0.09% Asian, and 1.00% from two or more races. 0.59% of the population were Hispanic or Latino of any race.

There were 870 households, out of which 32.60% had children under the age of 18 living with them, 63.60% were married couples living together, 4.80% had a female householder with no husband present, and 28.70% were non-families. 26.00% of all households were made up of individuals, and 13.10% had someone living alone who was 65 years of age or older. The average household size was 2.47 and the average family size was 3.00.

The county population contained 25.70% under the age of 18, 7.00% from 18 to 24, 25.20% from 25 to 44, 24.10% from 45 to 64, and 18.00% who were 65 years of age or older. The median age was 41 years. For every 100 females there were 96.60 males. For every 100 females age 18 and over, there were 97.30 males.

The median income for a household in the county was $29,894, and the median income for a family was $35,958. Males had a median income of $25,098 versus $18,913 for females. The per capita income for the county was $16,780. About 12.00% of families and 13.90% of the population were below the poverty line, including 18.70% of those under age 18 and 16.00% of those age 65 or over.

2010 census
As of the 2010 United States Census, there were 1,937 people, 850 households, and 540 families in the county. The racial makeup of the county was 94.7% white, 1.9% American Indian, 0.4% Asian, 0.2% black or African American, 0.1% Pacific islander, 0.2% from other races, and 2.6% from two or more races. Those of Hispanic or Latino origin made up 0.9% of the population. In terms of ancestry, 45.4% were German, 19.4% were Irish, 17.6% were Norwegian, 8.6% were English, 6.2% were Czech, 5.1% were Dutch, and 1.2% were American.

Of the 850 households, 23.8% had children under the age of 18 living with them, 56.6% were married couples living together, 4.2% had a female householder with no husband present, 36.5% were non-families, and 33.2% of all households were made up of individuals. The average household size was 2.24 and the average family size was 2.86. The median age was 48.8 years.

The median income for a household in the county was $46,281 and the median income for a family was $60,000. Males had a median income of $37,679 versus $22,277 for females. The per capita income for the county was $25,877. About 13.2% of families and 12.5% of the population were below the poverty line, including 14.9% of those under age 18 and 13.7% of those age 65 or over.

Housing cost
In 2007, the average price (in US dollars) for housing was:
 Single family home: $143,052
 Town homes and other attached homes: $116,019
 Twin homes: $176,744
 Mobile homes: $51,477

Communities

Towns
 Philip (county seat)
 Midland

Unincorporated communities

 Billsburg
 Kirley 
 Milesville
 Nowlin
 Ottumwa
 West Fork

Unorganized territories
 East Haakon
 West Haakon

Politics
The Haakon County voters are reliably Republican. In no national election since 1936 has the county selected the Democratic Party candidate.

See also
 National Register of Historic Places listings in Haakon County, South Dakota

References

 
1915 establishments in South Dakota
Populated places established in 1915
Norwegian-American culture in South Dakota